The Ligurian regional election of 1970 took place on 7–8 June 1970.

Events
Christian Democracy was the largest party and, narrowly ahead of the Italian Communist Party. After the election, Christian Democrat Gianni Dagnino formed a government comprising the Italian Socialist Party, the Unitary Socialist Party and the Italian Republican Party (organic centre-left).

Results

Source: Ministry of the Interior

Elections in Liguria
1970 elections in Italy